Viktor Ivanovich Chistyakov  (June 30, 1943, Leningrad, USSR - May 18, 1972, Kharkiv, USSR) - Soviet actor and parodist. One of the first masters parody  of the Soviet Union, achieved  star status.

Parody he wrote at different times of the actor , poets Ilya Reznik and Yuri Entin.

On May 18, 1972, he died, aged 28, onboard Aeroflot flight 1492 .

References

External links
 Страница памяти. Виктор Чистяков

Russian parodists
1943 births
1972 deaths
Russian male comedians
Victims of aviation accidents or incidents in the Soviet Union
Soviet male stage actors
20th-century comedians
Burials at Bogoslovskoe Cemetery